The Band of the Royal Corps of Signals is the band of the Royal Corps of Signals under the Royal Corps of Army Music. It was formed on the 29th August 1938 at Maresfield Park, Sussex and can be traced back to the Royal Engineers Signal Service.

History 
On the 29th of August 1938, the Band of the Royal Corps of Signals was formed from the 1st Division Telegraph Battalion, Royal Engineers. The Band's uniform is based on the Royal Engineers Band Uniform. The band moved to Catterick Garrison and then to Blandford Forum in Dorset, where it remained until 2014.

The Band of the Royal Corps of Signals has also appeared on the BBC's Songs of Praise.

See also 
 British Armed Forces
 Military band

External links 
Royal Corps of Signals
Royal Corps of Army Music

References 

Royal Corps of Army Music